David Hill (birth unknown) is a former professional rugby league footballer who played in the 1960s and 1970s.

Playing career

International honours
David Hill won a cap for Great Britain while at Wigan in 1971 against France.

County Cup Final appearances
David Hill played  in Wigan's 15-8 victory over Widnes in the 1971 Lancashire County Cup Final during the 1971–72 season at Knowsley Road, St. Helens on Saturday 28 August 1971, and played right-, i.e. number 3, in the 19-9 victory over Salford in the 1973 Lancashire County Cup Final during the 1973–74 season at Wilderspool Stadium, Warrington, on Saturday 13 October 1973.

BBC2 Floodlit Trophy Final appearances
David Hill played  in Wigan's 6-11 defeat by Leigh in the 1969 BBC2 Floodlit Trophy Final during the 1969–70 season at Central Park, Wigan on Tuesday 16 December 1969.

Personal life
David Hill is the younger brother of the rugby league footballer Cliff Hill. David Hill attended Ashton-in-Makerfield Grammar School.

References

External links
Statistics at rugbyleagueproject.org
Statistics at wigan.rlfans.com
Statistics at orl-heritagetrust.org.uk

Living people
Barrow Raiders players
English rugby league players
Great Britain national rugby league team players
Lancashire rugby league team players
Oldham R.L.F.C. players
Rugby league five-eighths
Rugby league players from St Helens, Merseyside
Wigan Warriors players
Year of birth missing (living people)